Li Muhao ( born June 2, 1992) is a Chinese basketball player who plays for Beijing Ducks in the Chinese Basketball Association.

Career statistics

CBA

References

1992 births
Living people
Basketball players at the 2016 Summer Olympics
Basketball players from Guizhou
Centers (basketball)
Chinese men's basketball players
Olympic basketball players of China
People from Guiyang
Shenzhen Leopards players